Yassine Chikhaoui (born 21 September 1986) is a Tunisian professional footballer who plays as an attacking midfielder for Tunisian club Étoile du Sahel.

Club career

Étoile du Sahel
Chikhaoui became captain of Étoile du Sahel at the age of 19. He was the youngest player to take up this role in the club.

He achieved a lot of success with Étoile du Sahel and won the CAF Champions League with them.

FC Zürich
Chikhaoui was signed by FC Zürich on a five-year contract on 23 May 2007.

During the 2008 Africa Cup of Nations, it was reported that many clubs had scouts present to watch Chikhaoui play. Unfortunately, after impressing at the African Cup of Nations he was forced to take time out to get a recurring knee problem treated. On 26 April 2009, he completed his recovery by returning to play for the Zurich first team. Weeks later he cemented his comeback with a goal and contributed, as a late substitute, to helping his team win and stay top in the title race.

He was part of the 2013–14 Swiss Cup winning team and afterwards signed a new three-year contract until 2017. In the 2014/2015 season he was appointed as the club's captain.

Al-Gharafa Sports Club
On 3 August 2015 his transfer to Al-Gharafa Sports Club was announced.

International career
He was called up to the Tunisian national team to participate in the 2006 FIFA World Cup at the age of 19.

Career statistics

International
Scores and results list Tunisia's goal tally first.

Honours
Étoile du Sahel
 Tunisian Ligue Professionnelle 1: 2006–07

FC Zürich
 Swiss Super League: 2008–09

Individual
 Tunisian Footballer of the Year: 2006

References

External links

1986 births
Living people
Tunisian footballers
2006 FIFA World Cup players
Étoile Sportive du Sahel players
FC Zürich players
Al-Gharafa SC players
Al Ahli SC (Doha) players
Tunisia international footballers
2008 Africa Cup of Nations players
Association football forwards
Association football midfielders
Tunisian expatriate footballers
Expatriate footballers in Switzerland
Swiss Super League players
2012 Africa Cup of Nations players
2015 Africa Cup of Nations players